Catholic Worker is a newspaper published seven times a year by the flagship Catholic Worker community in New York City. The newspaper was started by Dorothy Day and Peter Maurin to make people aware of church teaching on social justice.

History
It first appeared on May first, 1933 in an edition of 2,500 copies, to make people aware of the social justice teaching of the Catholic Church as an alternative to communism during the Depression. Its stated goal was to comfort the afflicted and to afflict the comfortable.  

Circulation rapidly rose to 25,000 within a few months, and reached 150,000 by 1936.

The Catholic Worker lost thousands of subscribers because of its strict pacifist stance and refusal to join in the call for U.S. involvement in World War II.
Dorothy Day was the editor of Catholic Worker until her death in 1980. 

The Catholic Worker covered the Civil rights movement in great depth  as liturgically based social action. 

Writers for the paper have ranged from young volunteers to such notable figures as Ammon Hennacy, Thomas Merton, Daniel Berrigan, Jeremy Scahill, Karl Meyer, Robert Coles, and Jacques Maritain. Ade Bethune and Fritz Eichenberg have frequently contributed illustrations. In the 1960s, Judith Palache Gregory was an editor (and later executor for Day's estate).

Description 
Day said the word "Worker" in the paper's title referred to "those who worked with hand or brain, those who did physical, mental, or spiritual work. But we thought primarily of the poor, the dispossessed, the exploited." 

The Catholic Worker is considered a Christian anarchist publication.

The price per issue has always been one cent.  The official annual subscription price in 2009 was 25 cents.

Masthead

1931
 Dorothy Day, editor
 Peter Maurain, editor
 John Day Jr, editor

1948
 Dorothy Day, managing editor and publisher
 Jack English, associate editor
 Irene Naughton, associate editor
 Robert L Ludlow, associate editor
 Tom Sullivan, associate editor

1960
 Dorothy Day, managing editor and publisher
 Ammon Hennacy, associate editor
 Elizabeth Roger, associate editor
 Roger Steed, associate editor
 Stanley Vishnewsky, associate editor
 Charles Butterworth, associate editor
 Arthur Sheehan, associate editor
 Judith Gregory (Judith Palache Gregory), associate editor
 Deane Mowrer, associate editor

See also
 Association of Catholic Trade Unionists (ACTU)

References

Further reading
 Rota, Olivier. "From a social question with religious echoes to a religious question with social echoes. The 'Jewish Question' and the English Catholic Worker (1939–1948)". Houston Catholic Worker, vol. XXV, no. 3 (May–June 2005):4–5.

External links

The Catholic Worker Movement
 Maurin, Day, the Catholic Worker, and Anarcho-Distributism  by Nicholas Evans 2018

Catholic Worker Movement
Newspapers published in New York City
Catholic newspapers published in the United States
Publications established in 1933
Anarchist newspapers
1933 establishments in New York City
Catholicism and far-left politics
Dorothy Day

es:Movimiento del Trabajador Católico#Pensamiento